Huatahi Turoa Brown 'Brownie' Paki (1900-1992) was a New Zealand rugby league footballer who played in the 1920s.

Born in Waikato, New Zealand in 1897, 'Brownie' Paki, he is remembered as one of the pioneers of Māori rugby league in New Zealand. He was captain of the Maori team that toured Australia in 1922. He captained the Auckland province team in 1922 and 1924 and Captain of the 1922 Maori touring team. His brother George Paki also played for New Zealand and played with and against him several times in his career.

Career
Originally lured to St. George by George Carstairs, 'Brownie' later recalled coming over to Sydney on the steamer, Marama and held with pride throughout his life that he played with St. George.
A popular personality, Paki was regarded as the first 'outsider' to be imported into Sydney football.
In 2006, Mr Tim Manukau of Huntly (NZ) writes:
Brownie was a very influential identity in the development of Māori Rugby League within the Waikato Region, as a player, administrator and an ambassador for the sport.
In 1922 he represented the "Rest of Australia" against the Kangaroos and scored a memorable try in that match at the Sydney Cricket Ground.

Later life
Brownie Paki assisted Tonga Mahuta in founding the Taniwharau Rugby League Club in Huntly, the very club that produced Kiwi league players such as Andy Berryman, Don Parkinson, Ricky Muru and most recently Wairangi Koopu and Lance Hohaia.

References

1900 births
1992 deaths
Auckland rugby league team captains
Auckland rugby league team players
City Rovers players
New Zealand Māori rugby league team captains
New Zealand Māori rugby league team players
New Zealand rugby league players
Rugby league wingers
St. George Dragons players